Digital Communication Network (referred to as DigiComNet or DCN) is a non-profit communication association founded in 2016. It is run by the board, selected out of the existing members of the network.

History 
Digital Communication Network, founded in 2016 after the same name program by the US Department of State, is a 6.000 member strong collaborative network that connects professionals of the digital age from a variety of backgrounds, in order to generate ideas, tools, and products for media outlets, civil society organizations, businesses and public authorities. Its main activities include professional trainings and workshops for media and related professionals as well as enhancing digital skills. Among DCN's biggest projects is an exchange program, funded by the US Department of State, and run by World Learning. The program invites nearly twenty media professionals from Eastern Europe and Central Asia for a three-weeks long internship in different media in the United States.

Today 
The organization aims to facilitate the collaboration between media, civic entrepreneurs, businesses, policymakers, creative, tech, and other professionals around the ideas of digital innovation, entrepreneurship, and open Internet. The organization unites over 6,000 members mostly from Eastern Europe and Central Asia.

The association develops projects in the following areas:

 Exchange programs for communication professionals;
 Camps, trainings, networking events, hackathons (ranging from international conferences to local meetups)
 Research on trends and best practices;
 Product development of the digital tools, content, and educational materials.
DCN's mission is to create lasting impact through empowering a new generation of voices and ideas in the digital communication space. To achieve this mission, DCN serves as an open space for communication, creativity and connectivity with the purpose of promoting truth and good values by being a catalyst for credible information and democratic changes in society.

Activities 
Among the organization’s biggest projects is an exchange program, funded by the US Department of State and run by World Learning called Digital Communication Network exchange. The program invites nearly twenty media professionals from Eastern Europe and Central Asia for a three-weeks long internship in different media in the United States.

Digital Communication Network is associated with different projects such as the Rockit Conferences (co-organised with Granat), which bring together activists from civil society, journalists, tech developers, and businesses. Other projects include workshops and trainings for media and other professionals such as Training for Trainers camps

History of all events 
Here is the list of the events the Digital Communication network has helped organize or co-organized.

 Rockit Conference, Chisinau, Moldova, Feb 5–6, 2016
 Language of disruptors. A digital talk, Tallinn, Estonia, March 10, 2016
 Forum on Fact Checking for Political Journalism, Vilnius, Lithuania, Aug 19–20, 2016
 TechCampWAW, Warsaw, Poland, Feb 15–16, 2017
 Rockit Digital Summit, Warsaw, Poland, Feb 16–17, 2017
 Digital Disruption Forum, Kyiv, Ukraine, Apr 3–4, 2017
 Rockit Conference 2017, Chisinau, Moldova, May 11–12, 2017
 Online Education Camp, Poiana Brasov, Romania, Aug 10–13, 2017
 Business of Truth. Digital Impact, Belgrade, Serbia, Sep 8–9, 2017
 DataFest Tbilisi 2017, Tbilisi, Georgia, Nov 15–17, 2017
 Digital Communication Training for Trainers Camp, Ukraine, Apr 19–21, 2018
 Future for Digital: Big Media, Big Changes, Gdansk, Poland, Apr 26–27, 2018
 Rockit Conference 2018, Chisinau, Moldova, April 27, 2018
 Digital Transformation Forum / Governance x Watchdogs, Bucharest, Romania, May 3–4, 2018
Digital Influencers Hub Forum, Thessaloniki, Greece, September 13-14, 2018 
Business of Truth Forum, Johannesburg, South Africa, November 29-30, 2018 
Media Literacy 360° Forum and Fair, Bratislava, Slovakia, December 11-12, 2018 
Digital Influencers in Action Forum, Budva, Montenegro, June 18-19, 2019 
Humor and Games for Social Good, Yerevan, Armenia, September 6-7, 2019 
 Rockit Conference 2019, Chisinau, Moldova, October 11, 2019
Media Literacy Solutions Forum, Minsk, Belarus, October 18-19, 2019 
Launching event of DCN Southeast Europe Hub, Thessaloniki, Greece, December 13, 2019 
Digital Storytelling for Impact Forum, Sofia, Bulgaria, December 16-17, 2019 
 Rockit Conference 2020, Chisinau, Moldova, May 8-9, 2020
Mediaboost, Ukraine, June-December, 2020 
The Day After Covid-19 #digitaltroubleshooting, Thessaloniki, Greece, July 15, 2020 
Future of Democracy, Chisinau, Moldova, Sep 29, 2020
Unlocking the truth with digital literacy, DCN Africa, October 6, 2020 
Games for Impact, Warsaw, Poland, December 8-11, 2020 
Combating Disinformation in South-East Asia, Online Event, December 10, 2020

References

External links
 

Organizations based in Estonia
Organizations established in 2016